Mangler is a software design pattern. A Mangler is a pattern that performs multiple operations over a series of data, similar to the MapReduce function inside of Bigtable and Amazon's Dynamo.  Typically, a mangler is fed a series of Maps from which it performs its internal operations and passes its internal state/data to an external Filter.

A typical usage of the Mangler Pattern is during internal search operations.  When parsing a query from an end-user, the system will try to strip out a series of un-needed tokens, reassembling the original query into a more usable, functional query.

An important distinction between the Mangler and other patterns is the "Modify in place" optimization, pioneered by the pattern's creator.

This pattern was created by Dr. John Watson, during his tenure at TransUnion's Research and Development Lab.

Java 

// This is a trivial implementation of Mangler in Java.

public interface TokenMangler {
	List<String> mangleTokens (List<String> tokens);
}

public class LowerCasingTokenMangler implements TokenMangler {

	List<String> mangleTokens (List<String> tokens) {
		List<String> results = new ArrayList<String>();

		for (String token : tokens) {
			results.add(token.toLowerCase());
		}

		return results;
	}
}

Software design patterns